Zamanabad-e Mohammadabad (also Romanized as Zamānābād-e Moḩammadābād) is a village in Almahdi Rural District, Jowkar District, Malayer County, Hamadan Province, Iran. At the 2006 census, its population was 118, in 37 families.

References 

Populated places in Malayer County